was the smallest of the big three Japanese airlines. In contrast to the other two, JAL and ANA, JAS' international route network was very small, but its domestic network incorporated many smaller airports that were not served by the two larger airlines. As an independent company, it was last headquartered in the JAS M1 Building at Haneda Airport in Ōta, Tokyo. It has since merged with Japan Airlines.

JAS was famous for its variety of aircraft liveries; Amy Chavez of The Japan Times described the rainbow liveries as "abstract." Many of its color schemes in the 1990s were designed by film director Akira Kurosawa.

The airline's slogan was "Good Speed Always".

History

Formation
It adopted the Japan Air System (JAS) name on April 1, 1988.

Start of international service
In 1988, Japan Air System began service from Narita to Seoul, South Korea, and Taiwan and by 1993 JAS was also flying to Singapore, Honolulu and Indonesia. In 1995 the airline had 99 domestic routes, some international routes, 64 offices in Japan, one office in Seoul, South Korea, and one office in Guangzhou, People's Republic of China.

JAS entered into a partnership with Northwest Airlines in 1999 following several years of negotiations, allowing Northwest to codeshare on JAS domestic routes from Kansai Airport in Osaka and JAS to codeshare on Northwest flights between Japan and the US. On Northwest's fifth freedom flights between Japan and Asia, JAS was limited to codesharing on Northwest routes that JAS also had the authority to fly, such as Tokyo-Seoul.

Boeing 777 livery design contest

In 1996, Japan Air System held a contest for designing the livery of the Boeing 777. The youngest entrant was three years of age while the oldest was 84. A total of 10,364 participants from 42 countries submitted entries. Thirteen-year-old , a male second year (Grade 8) junior high school student living near Chitose Airport, won the award. The Japan Air System Boeing 777, painted in Watanabe's design, premiered in April 1997 to commemorate the 25th anniversary of Japan Air System.

Merger with Japan Airlines

JAS and Japan Airlines announced their merger in November 2001. It was the first major airline industry realignment in Japan in three decades, and partly a consequence of the slump in worldwide air traffic following the September 11, 2001 attacks in the United States. At the time, JAL had only a 25% share of the Japanese domestic air travel market, half that of rival All Nippon Airways, and saw the merger as a means of providing stronger competition to ANA domestically.

JAS and JAL prepared an integrated timetable in August 2002. On October 2, 2002, they established a new holding company, with Isao Kaneko as CEO. A new "Arc of the Sun" livery for the JAL group was announced in September 2002 and the first aircraft with the livery rolled out in November. On April 1, 2004, Japan Airlines changed its name to Japan Airlines International and Japan Air System changed its name to Japan Airlines Domestic, officially ending the JAS brand. Japan Airlines Domestic was merged with Japan Airlines International on October 1, 2006, and disappeared both in name and reality.

At the time of its integration into JAL, JAS operated the Airbus A300, Boeing 777, MD-80 and MD-90. Most continued flying as part of the JAL fleet, but three A300s were scrapped at Sendai Airport in 2002, while two others were transferred to Fly Air in Turkey.

Corporate affairs

When Toa Domestic Airlines was originally established on May 15, 1971, its headquarters were located at the Japan Airlines Haneda Maintenance Center (羽田日本航空メンテナンスセンター Haneda Nihon Kōkū Mentanensu Sentā) at Tokyo International Airport (Haneda Airport) in Ōta, Tokyo. On August 11, 2003, as JAS was being merged into Japan Airlines, the JAS headquarters moved from Haneda Maintenance Center 1 to the JAL Building in Shinagawa, Tokyo.

Destinations Prior to Merger

Domestic

Greater Tokyo Area
Tokyo
Osaka
Greater Osaka Area
Toyooka
Shirahama
Nagoya
Komatsu
Matsumoto
Niigata
Akita
Aomori
Misawa
Hanamaki
Sendai
Yamagata
Hiroshima
Okayama
Izumo
Asahikawa
Kushiro
Memanbetsu (now Ozora)
Obihiro
Sapporo
Fukuoka
Kitakyūshū
Kagoshima
Kumamoto
Miyazaki
Nagasaki
Oita
Matsuyama
Takamatsu
Kōchi
Tokushima
Amami Ōshima
Kagoshima
Naha
Tokunoshima

International

Guangzhou - Guangzhou Baiyun International Airport
Kunming - Kunming Wujiaba International Airport
Xi'an - Xi'an Xianyang International Airport

Jakarta - Soekarno–Hatta International Airport

Hong Kong
Kai Tak Airport (demolished)
Hong Kong International Airport

Seoul
Gimpo International Airport
Incheon International Airport

Singapore Changi Airport (closed prior to JAS's dissolution)

Taichung - Taichung International Airport
Taipei - Chiang Kai-shek International Airport

Honolulu - Daniel K. Inouye International Airport (Closed prior to JAS's dissolution)

Subsidiaries
Japan Air System had the following subsidiaries:
Japan Air Commuter
Hokkaido Air System
Harlequin Air

Fleet

Japan Air System had formerly operated the following aircraft since it commenced operations:

Credit cards
In association with Visa, MasterCard, and Japan Credit Bureau JAS had "JAS Card" credit cards. In addition JAS had "Sky Merit" cards.

Accidents and incidents
July 3, 1971, Toa Domestic Airlines Flight 63: A NAMC YS-11A owned by Toa Domestic Airlines crashed into terrain, killing all 68 occupants.
May 25, 1975, a NAMC YS-11A (JA8680) had a hydraulic oil leak and forced the crew to return to Osaka. During landing, one of the tires blew causing the aircraft to veer off the runway. The aircraft crossed a sod area and a drainage ditch. The caused of the oil leak was by a loose connection of the hydraulic line in the left flap well.
April 18, 1993, Japan Air System Flight 451: A McDonnell Douglas DC-9-41, flying from Nagoya to Hanamaki, crashed after the aircraft, caught by windshear, skidded off of the runway. All of the passengers and crew survived.
January 1, 2004, Japan Air System Flight 979: a McDonnell Douglas MD-81 (JA8297) sustained substantial damage in a landing gear accident at Tokunoshima. On landing, the aircraft's left main landing gear collapsed during rollout and its left wing tip contacted the ground. The aircraft came to a stop on the runway. Three passengers were slightly injured.

Special liveries
Japan Air System, for a period, painted a McDonnell Douglas DC-10 in a Peter Pan color scheme.

See also
 List of defunct airlines of Japan

References

External links

 Archives of http://www.jas.co.jp/e_jashom.htm
 Archives of http://www.jas.co.jp/eng/index.htm
 Archives of http://www.jas.co.jp
 Gallery of JAS liveries 
 A tale of many tails: the merger of Japan Airlines and Japan Air System makes perfect business sense, but commonality of equipment is a different matter. Air Transport World. April 1, 2003.

 
Defunct airlines of Japan
Airlines established in 1964
Airlines disestablished in 2005